Purulia songs are Bengali songs, performed mainly in the Bengali language. Purulia songs are popular with young people in the West Bengal rural areas, particularly in Purulia, Birbhum, and Bankura districts. The format is similar to the Rabindra Sangeet.

Purulia is famous for its widely renowned traditional songs. The prime types of traditional songs are -

Jhumur
Boul
Karamgeet
Tusugeet
Bhadu
Bihargeet
Ahirageet
For further reading- Bengali Journal ANUSTUP, Winter 2016, Article- Pashchim Puruliar Biyer Ganer Kabyamulya o Bhasagata Boishistya, by Goutam Kumar Mandal.

Singers 

 Kanika Karmakar
 Kavita Das
 Rupa Verma 
 Shankar Tantubai
 Yadav Das
 bablu mahato

Culture of West Bengal
Purulia district
Bengali music
Purulia